Trevor Cox (born August 12, 1995) is a Canadian ice hockey player. He is currently playing for the Cardiff Devils of the Elite Ice Hockey League.

Junior career
Cox began his junior career with the Medicine Hat Tigers of the Western Hockey League. During the 2014–15 WHL season, Cox led the league with 80 assists and was named to the WHL Eastern Conference First All-Star Team. On October 28, 2015, Cox was traded to the Vancouver Giants for Clayton Kirichenko. Cox later joined the Quad City Mallards of the ECHL for the latter stages of the 2015-16 ECHL season including their playoff run before moving to the University of Alberta.

Career statistics

Regular season and playoffs

References

External links

1995 births
Living people
Alberta Golden Bears ice hockey players
Canadian ice hockey forwards
Ice hockey people from British Columbia
Medicine Hat Tigers players
Quad City Mallards (ECHL) players
Sportspeople from Surrey, British Columbia
Surrey Eagles players
Vancouver Giants players
HC 07 Detva players
Cardiff Devils players
Canadian expatriate ice hockey players in Wales
Canadian expatriate ice hockey players in the United States
Canadian expatriate ice hockey players in Slovakia